The Munster GAA Hurling Under-20 Championship, known simply as the Munster Under-20 Championship, is an annual inter-county hurling competition organised by the Munster Council of the Gaelic Athletic Association (GAA). It is the highest inter-county hurling competition for male players between the ages of 17 and 20 in the province of Munster. The championship was contested as the Munster Under-21 Championship between 1964 and 2018 before changing to an under-20 age category from 2019. It is sponsored by Bord Gáis Energy.

The final, currently held in July, serves as the culmination of a series of games played during a three-week period, and the results determine which team receives the J. J. Kenneally Perpetual Memorial Cup. The championship has always been played on a straight knockout basis whereby once a team loses they are eliminated from the championship.

The Munster Championship is an integral part of the wider GAA Hurling Under-20 All-Ireland Championship. The winners and runners-up of the Munster final, like their counterparts in the Leinster Championship, advance to the semi-final stage of the All-Ireland series of games.

Five teams currently participate in the Munster Championship. Tipperary and Cork are the most successful teams with 21 titles each.

Seven teams have competed since the inception of the Munster Championship in 1964. The title has been won at least once by five teams, all of whom have won the title more than once. Limerick are the current champions.

History

Creation

The Munster Championship began in 1964 in response to a Congress motion put forward by the Kerry County Board for the introduction of a new championship grade. It was the fifth championship to be created after the senior, junior, minor and intermediate grades.

Beginnings

The inaugural Munster Championship featured Clare, Cork, Galway, Kerry, Limerick, Tipperary and Waterford. Galway and Kerry contested the very first match on Sunday 31 May 1964. Tipperary won the inaugural championship.

Team dominance

Since the beginning the championship has been dominated by Cork and Tipperary. They won all bar one of the available championship titles between 1964 and 1985 and have won a combined total of 39 championship titles. Cork also have the distinction of becoming the first team to win four championships in-a-row between 1968 and 1971. Tipperary equalled this record with their own four-in-a-row between 1978 and 1981 and, after defeat in 1982, came back to win a further three titles in succession between 1983 and 1985.

Waterford were the only team beside Cork and Tipperary to win the championship, with their lone title being claimed in 1974. Limerick broke the Cork-Tipperary dominance in 1986 and 1987 by claiming back-to-back championship titles. Waterford made the breakthrough by claiming championship wins in 1992 and 1994, however, the rest of the decade belonged to Cork and Tipperary once again.

The new century saw further breakthroughs as the Cork-Tipperary hegemony was broken up. Limerick have become the most successful team of the 21st century. After claiming three successive championship titles between 2000 and 2002, they won further titles in 2011, 2015 and 2017. After losing twelve Munster finals between 1972 and 2008, Clare finally claimed their first championship in 2009. They went on to claim three successive championships between 2012 and 2014. Waterford won their fourth championship after a 22-year gap in 2016.

Proposed changes

In 2008 a motion was brought before a special Congress in an effort to combat player burnout. It was proposed to merge the existing under-21 and minor championships to create a new Munster Under-19 Hurling Championship based on the provincial system. This motion was defeated by 115 votes to 58.

A similar motion was later introduced in an effort to lower the age and create a new Munster Under-20 Championship based on the provincial system, however, this motion was also defeated.

Age change

At the GAA Congress on 24 February 2018, the age limit of the championship was changed to twenty, following a successful motion by the Offaly County Board. In contrast to Gaelic football, under-20 hurlers are eligible to play both under-20 and senior hurling for their county.

Current format

Championship

The Munster Championship is a knockout tournament with pairings drawn at random. Each match is played as a single leg. If a match is drawn there is a period of extra time, however, if the sides still remain level a replay is required.

There are five teams in the Munster Championship. An open draw is made in which three of the five teams automatically qualify for the semi-final stage of the competition. Two other teams play in a lone quarter-final with the winner joining the other three teams at the semi-final stage.

Qualification for the All-Ireland Championship

As of the 2018 championship qualification for the All-Ireland Championship has changed due to the introduction of a "back door" for defeated finalists. Both the champions and runners-up qualify for the All-Ireland semi-finals.

Teams

2022 championship

The following five teams will compete during the 2022 championship.

Historic team changes

In spite of contesting the inaugural Munster Championship in 1964, Kerry had always been known as a county that was dominated by Gaelic football. Because of this the inter-county hurling team went into a sharp decline. Kerry's championship appearances were sporadic, while the team also suffered a number of heavy defeats before regrading to the All-Ireland Under-21 B Hurling Championship.

Non-Munster team

Due to a lack of meaningful competition in Connacht, Galway competed in the senior, intermediate and minor championships in Munster since 1959. Following the introduction of the under-21 grade, Galway played in the Munster Championship from 1964 until 1969. During that time they contested two finals.

Venues

History

Munster Championship matches were traditionally played at neutral venues or at a location that was deemed to be halfway between the two participants; however, teams eventually came to home and away agreements depending on the capabilities of their stadiums. Cork and Tipperary, Limerick and Cork and Limerick and Tipperary were the first teams to develop home and away agreements whereby every second meeting between teams was played at the home venue of one of them. All of the current teams have home and away agreements.

Attendances

Stadium attendances are a significant source of regular income for the Munster Council and for the teams involved. For the 2017 championship, average attendances were 6,138 with a total aggregate attendance figure of 24,554.

Final

The venue for the final also comes under the terms of the individual home and away agreements between the teams involved. Semple Stadium in Thurles has hosted more finals than any other venue. In 1965 the final was held outside the province of Munster for the only time in the history of the championship when Tipperary defeated Galway in Ballinasloe, County Galway. The attendance at the 2018 Munster final was 6,732.

Managers

Managers in the Munster Championship are involved in the day-to-day running of the team, including the training, team selection, and sourcing of players from the club championships. Their influence varies from county-to-county and is related to the individual county boards. The manager is assisted by a team of two or three selectors and an extensive backroom team consisting of various coaches. The under-20 team manager also works closely with the senior team manager due to an overlap of players on both teams. Prior to the development of the concept of a manager in the 1970s, teams were usually managed by a team of selectors with one member acting as chairman.

Trophy and medals

The Corn na Cásca (Easter Cup) was first presented in 1966 to commemorate the golden jubilee of the 1916 Easter Rising. The cup was retired in 2018 when Shane Kingston of Cork was the last person to captain a team to the Munster Under-21 Championship title.

On 23 July 2019, a new cup for Munster Under-20 Championship was presented by the family of the late J. J. Kenneally by members of the Kenneally family to Munster GAA Chairman Liam Lenihan. Known as the J. J. Kenneally Perpetual Memorial Cup, the trophy commemorates the memory of one of Limerick city's most well-known jewellers and businessmen. The Kenneally family have supplied Munster GAA with medals and trophies for many years and they have donated this trophy in memory of J. J. Kenneally, a former president of the St. Patrick's club in Limerick.

At the end of the Munster final, the winning team is presented with the cup. The cup is held by the winning team until the following year's final. Traditionally, the presentation is made at a special rostrum in the stand where GAA and political dignitaries and special guests view the match.

The cup is decorated with ribbons in the colours of the winning team. During the game the cup actually has both teams' sets of ribbons attached and the runners-up ribbons are removed before the presentation. The winning captain accepts the cup on behalf of his team before giving a short speech. Individual members of the winning team then have an opportunity to come to the rostrum to lift the cup.

In accordance with GAA rules, the Munster Council awards up to twenty-four gold medals to the winners of the Munster final.

Sponsorship
Since 2003, the Munster Championship has been sponsored. The sponsor has usually been able to determine the championship's sponsorship name.

General statistics

Performance by county

Records

Final

Team

Most titles: 21:
 Cork (1966, 1968, 1969, 1970, 1971, 1973, 1975, 1976, 1977, 1982, 1988, 1991, 1993, 1996, 1997, 1998, 2005, 2007, 2018, 2020, 2021)
 Tipperary (1964, 1965, 1967, 1972, 1978, 1979, 1980, 1981, 1983, 1984, 1985, 1989, 1990, 1995, 1999, 2003, 2004, 2006, 2008, 2010, 2019)
Most consecutive title wins: 4, joint record:
Cork (1968, 1969, 1970, 1971)
Tipperary (1978, 1979, 1980, 1981)
Most appearances in a final: 35:
Tipperary (1964, 1965, 1967, 1968, 1969, 1970, 1971, 1972, 1978, 1979, 1980, 1981, 1983, 1984, 1985, 1989, 1990, 1995, 1997, 1998, 1999, 2001, 2002, 2003, 2004, 2005, 2006, 2008, 2010, 2012, 2013, 2016, 2018, 2019, 2020)
Most appearances without winning: 2:
Galway (1965, 1967)

Individual

Most wins: 4, Mick Malone (Cork) (1968, 1969, 1970, 1971)

Teams

By decade

The most successful team of each decade, judged by number of championship titles, is as follows:

 1960s: 3 each for Tipperary (1964-65-67) and Cork (1966-68-69)
 1970s: 6 for Cork (1970-71-73-75-76-77)
 1980s: 6 for Tipperary (1980-81-83-84-85-89)
 1990s: 5 for Cork (1991-93-96-97-98)
 2000s: 4 for Tipperary (2003-04-06-08)
 2010s: 3 each for Limerick (2011-15-17) and Clare (2012-13-14)

Gaps

Top five longest gaps between successive championship titles:
 22 years: Waterford (1994-2016)
 18 years: Waterford (1974-1992)
 13 years: Limerick (1987-2000)
 11 years: Cork (2007-2018)
 9 years: Limerick (2002-2011)
 9 years: Tipperary (2010-2019)

Scoreline records

Munster finals

 The most one sided Munster finals:
 23 points – 1964: Tipperary 8–09 (33) – (10) 3–01 Waterford
 22 points – 1989: Tipperary 5–16 (31) – (9) 1–06 Limerick
 21 points – 2000: Limerick 4–18 (30) – (9) 1–06 Cork
 15 points – 1966: Cork 5–12 (27) – (12) 2–06 Limerick
 15 points – 2014: Clare 1–28 (31) – (16) 1–13 Cork

All matches

 The most one sided semi-finals and first round matches:
 40 points – 1988: Kerry 0–00 (0) – (40) 5–25 Tipperary
 39 points – 1997: Kerry 0–05 (5) – (44) 6–26 Cork
 35 points – 1967: Kerry 0–04 (4) – (40) 9–12 Tipperary
 34 points – 1972: Kerry 1–05 (8) – (40) 9–15 Limerick

Top scorers

Overall

By year

In a single game

In finals

Attendance

Finals

Miscellaneous
 Mick Malone of Cork holds the record of being the only player to win four consecutive Munster under-21 winners' medals on the field of play.  These victories came in 1968, 1969, 1970 and 1971.
 Cork and Tipperary jointly hold the record for the longest streak of success.  Both counties have won four-in-a-row with Cork's coming between 1968 and 1971 and Tipperary's coming a decade later between 1978 and 1981.
 Cork hold the record for the most consecutive appearances in Munster finals.  They played in eight-in-a-row between 1975 and 1982, not including a replay in 1978, with success coming on four of those occasions.
 Clare lost twelve Munster finals, not including a replay in 1986, before winning their first in 2009.
 Two counties have completed the Munster under-21 and senior double in the same year:
 Cork in 1966, 1969, 1970, 1975, 1976, 1977, 1982, 2005
 Tipperary in 1964, 1965, 1967, 1989, 2008, 2019
 Cork is the only county to have completed the Munster minor, under-21 and senior treble in the same year.  These feats were achieved in 1966, 1969, 1970, 1975, 1977 and 2005.
 Cork is the only county to have completed the Munster minor, under-21, intermediate and senior 'grand slam' in the same year.  This was achieved in 2005.
 Five players have captained their counties to Munster titles in both the under-21 and senior grades:
 Gerald McCarthy captained Cork to the under-21 title in 1966 and the senior titles in 1966 and 1975.
 Eoin Kelly captained Tipperary to the under-21 title in 2003 and the senior title in 2008.
 Five players have captained their counties to Munster titles in both the minor and under-21 grades:
 Anthony O'Riordan captained Limerick to the minor title in 1984 and the under-21 title in 1986.
 Diarmaid FitzGerald captained Tipperary to the minor title in 2001 and the under-21 title in 2004.
 Shane O'Neill captained Cork to the minor title in 2004 and the under-21 title in 2007.
 Paul Flanagan captained Clare to the minor title in 2010 and the Under-21 title in 2013.
 Tony Kelly captained Clare to the minor title in 2011 and the Under-21 title in 2014.

List of Munster Finals

Notes:
 1978 - The first match ended in a draw: Tipperary 3-13, Cork 4-10 at Semple Stadium.
 1986 - The first match ended in a draw: Limerick 3-09, Clare 3-09 at the Gaelic Grounds.
 2000 - The first match ended in a draw: Limerick 1-13, Cork 1-13 at Páirc Uí Chaoimh.

References

Sources
 Complete list of winning teams from Munster GAA website

Munster GAA inter-county hurling competitions
Recurring sporting events established in 1964
1964 establishments in Ireland
Mun